Yalveh may refer to:
 Yalveh-ye Olya
 Yalveh-ye Sofla